Ukunda Airport  is a small airfield near Diani Beach in Kwale County, Kenya.  The airport serves the local areas of Diani, Tiwi and Msambweni.

Services 
The airport started operating Air Kenya services to and from Nairobi's Wilson airport as of 2013. Many services used to be private charter, providing tourist access between beach resorts and inland game reserves.

The start of budget airlines that ferry domestic and international tourists back and forth to Nairobi has sped up the development of Diani Beach as the main tourist beach hub in Kenya.

Diani Beach Airport operates daily flights from Nairobi Wilson (WIL) and Nairobi Jomo Kenyatta (NBO), and flights to the Masai Mara, Moi International Airport Mombasa (MBA) and Kilifi.

The Kenya Airports Authority have reported their intention to extend the runway, allowing access to larger aircraft. It is then expected that the airport will offer services to Jomo Kenyatta International Airport in Nairobi, as well as international flights to Zanzibar, Arusha and Dar es Salaam.

In January 2019, the Kenya Civil Aviation Authority (KCAA), commissioned a mobile airport control tower, procured at a price of KSh150 million (approx. US$1.5 million), for use at this airstrip.

Airlines and destinations

Incidents 
At 14:15 EAT on 28 November 2002, an Eagle Aviation Let L-410 Turbolet en route to Ukunda from Musiara Airstrip crashed at Mara Intrepids Airstrip after developing engine problems.  The crew had decided to attempt an emergency landing, but crashed before landing.  There was one fatality, a crew member; the other 18 passengers and remaining crew members survived.

References 

Airports in Kenya
Kwale County